= Committee on Naval Affairs =

Committee on Naval Affairs may refer to:

- United States House Committee on Naval Affairs
- United States Senate Committee on Naval Affairs
